Attorney General Tucker may refer to:

John Randolph Tucker (politician) (1823–1897), Attorney General of Virginia
Jim Guy Tucker (born 1943), Attorney General of Arkansas